was the 5th President of the Japanese Olympic Committee (1945–1946).

|-

|-

|-

|-

|-

References
 慶應義塾史跡めぐり スポーツの父 平沼亮三 - 慶應義塾月刊三田評論ホームページ 2010年6月5日閲覧。

1879 births
1959 deaths
Members of the Japanese Olympic Committee
Japanese businesspeople
People from Yokohama
Japanese sportsperson-politicians